Pirdaudan (also, Pirudan and Pirdoudan) is a town in the Syunik Province of Armenia.

See also 
Syunik Province

External links 

Populated places in Syunik Province